A list of Egyptian scientists.

 Ahmad Fakhri
 Ahmed Kamal
 Ahmed Zewail
 Ali Moustafa Mosharafa
 Aziz Suryal Atiya
 Essam E. Khalil
 Essam Heggy
 Farouk El-Baz
 Faten Zahran Mohammed
 Fawzia Fahim
 Gamal Hemdan
 Hamed Gohar
 Hatim Zaghloul
 Hesham Sallam
 Hussein Zedan
 Ibrahim Abouleish
 Kamal el-Mallakh
 Labib Habachi
 Magdi Yacoub
 Mahmoud Samir Fayed
 Mohamed M. Atalla
 Mostafa Kamal Tolba
 Moustapha Kassem
 Rana el Kaliouby
 Rushdi Said
 Sameera Moussa
 Samir Amin
 Selim Hassan
 Yehia El-Mashad

See also
 List of Egyptians

References

Egyptian scientists
Science and technology in Egypt
Egyptian